Francis Edward MacGregor (born 1950) is a Seychellois judge and politician from Seychelles People's Progressive Front. He served as the Speaker of the National Assembly of Seychelles from 1993 to 2007, as the first speaker after the 1993 multiparty elections. 

Earlier, he was elected as the Chairman of the People's Assembly after the 1987 elections. 
MacGregor wrote a book about the legislative history in Seychelles.

He is a lawyer by profession, and current serves as a judge in the judiciary of Seychelles.

References

1950 births
Living people
Speakers of the National Assembly (Seychelles)
United Seychelles Party politicians
Seychellois judges